Funza is a municipality and town of Colombia in the Western Savanna Province, of the department of Cundinamarca. In Funza the La Florida wetland, part of the wetlands of Bogotá, a remnant of the Pleistocene Lake Humboldt, still exists. The town is part of the Metropolitan Area of Bogotá and borders Madrid and Tenjo in the north, Mosquera in the south, Madrid in the west and Cota and the locality Engativá of the capital Bogotá in the east. The eastern boundary is formed by the Bogotá River. Funza is the site of the former main settlement Bacatá of the Muisca Confederation. Modern Funza was founded by Gonzalo Jiménez de Quesada during the Spanish conquest of the Muisca on April 20, 1537.

Etymology 
The name Funza comes from Chibcha and means "Powerful lord".

History 
In the times before the Spanish conquest, Funza was an important village in the Muisca Confederation. This loose confederation of rulers of the Muisca had as southern ruler the zipa based in Bacatá, the present-day municipality of Funza.

Modern Funza was founded by conquistador Gonzalo Jiménez de Quesada en route in his search for El Dorado on April 20, 1537.

On January 21, 1972, a Líneas Aéreas La Urraca flight crashed in Funza after an explosion on board.

Economy 
The economy of Funza is based on agricultural and industrial activities. Main agricultural products are potatoes and maize. Other industries involve plastics and metalcraft production.

Gallery

See also 

Spanish conquest of the Muisca
Muisca
Wetlands of Bogotá

References 

Municipalities of Cundinamarca Department
Populated places established in 1537
1537 establishments in the Spanish Empire
1537 disestablishments in the Muisca Confederation
Muysccubun